Aidonia is a village and a community of the Grevena municipality. Before the 2011 local government reform it was a part of the municipality of Irakleotes, of which it was a municipal district. The 2011 census recorded 53 residents in the village and 64 residents in the community. The community of Aidonia covers an area of 14.703 km2.

Administrative division
The community of Kokkinia consists of two separate settlements: 
Aidonia (population 53)
Dasaki (population 11)
The aforementioned population figures are as of 2011.

See also
 List of settlements in the Grevena regional unit

References

Populated places in Grevena (regional unit)